Rhododendron trichostomum (毛嘴杜鹃) is a rhododendron species native to southwestern China, where it grows at altitudes of . The flowers are pink or white.

Synonyms
Rhododendron fragrans Franch.
Rhododendron ledoides Balf.f. & W.W.Sm.
Rhododendron sphaeranthum Balf.f. & W.W.Sm.

References

"Rhododendron trichostomum", Franchet, J. Bot. (Morot). 9: 396. 1895.

trichostomum